Loxura cassiopeia is a butterfly in the family Lycaenidae.It was described by William Lucas Distant in 1884. It is found in  the Indomalayan realm.

Subspecies
 Loxura cassiopeia cassiopeia (Peninsular Malaysia, Thailand)
 Loxura cassiopeia amatica Fruhstorfer, 1912 (northern Borneo, Palawan)
 Loxura cassiopeia numana Fruhstorfer, 1912 (western Sumatra)
 Loxura cassiopeia fuscicaudata Fruhstorfer, 1912 (Nias)
 Loxura cassiopeia batunensis Fruhstorfer, 1913 (Batu)
 Loxura cassiopeia yilma Fruhstorfer, 1926 (Mindanao)
 Loxura cassiopeia ptesia Riley, 1945 (Mentawi)
 Loxura cassiopeia takioi Hayashi, 1976 (Palawan)
 Loxura cassiopeia owadai Hayashi, 1976 (Mindanao)

References

External links
Loxura at Markku Savela's Lepidoptera and Some Other Life Forms

Loxura
Butterflies described in 1884